{{DISPLAYTITLE:DOx}}

4-Substituted-2,5-dimethoxyamphetamines (DOx) is a chemical class of substituted amphetamine derivatives featuring methoxy groups at the 2- and 5- positions of the phenyl ring, and a substituent such as alkyl or halogen at the 4- position of the phenyl ring. Most compounds of this class are potent and long-lasting psychedelic drugs, and act as highly selective 5-HT2A, 5-HT2B, and 5-HT2C receptor partial agonists. A few bulkier derivatives such as DOAM have similarly high binding affinity for 5-HT2 receptors but instead act as antagonists, and so do not produce psychedelic effects though they retain amphetamine-like stimulant effects.

DOx derivatives
The DOx family includes the following members:

Related compounds
A number of additional compounds are known with alternative substitutions:

See also
 2Cs, 25-NB
 Substituted amphetamines
 Substituted benzofurans
 Substituted cathinones
 Substituted methylenedioxyphenethylamines
 Substituted phenethylamines
 Substituted tryptamines

References

External links
 PiHKAL ("Phenethylamines I Have Known And Loved") by Alexander "Sasha" Shulgin (1991)
 Psychotomimetic Drugs: Structure-Activity Relationships by Alexander "Sasha" Shulgin (1978)

Chemical classes of psychoactive drugs
2,5-Dimethoxyphenethylamines